Oncopeltus cayensis is a species of seed bug in the family Lygaeidae. It is found in the Caribbean Sea and North America.

References

Further reading

External links

 

Lygaeidae
Articles created by Qbugbot
Insects described in 1944